The surname Labine may refer to:

 Claire Labine (1934–2016), U.S. soap opera writer
 Clem Labine (1926–2007), U.S. baseball player
 Eleanor Labine, American TV writer 
 Gilbert Labine (1890–1977), Canadian prospector
 Kyle Labine (born 1983), Canadian actor
 Leonard Gerald Labine (1931–2005), Canadian ice hockey player
 Marcel Labine (born 1948), Canadian poet
 Matthew Labine (1959–2017), American soap opera writer
 Robert Labine (1940–2021), Canadian politician
 Tyler Labine (born 1978), Canadian actor and comedian